Mark Leduc (May 4, 1962 – July 22, 2009) was a boxer from Canada, who won a silver medal at the 1992 Barcelona Summer Olympics.

Amateur career
Amateur Record: 184-26
Won an Olympic Silver Medal 1992 for Canada.

Olympic results 
Defeated Godfrey Wakaabu (Uganda) 9-2
Defeated Dillon Carew (Guyana) 5-0
Defeated Laid Bouneb (Algeria) 8-1
Defeated Leonard Dorin (Romania) 13-6
Lost to Héctor Vinent (Cuba) 1-11

Professional boxing career
Leduc turned pro in 1992 and had limited success.  He retired in 1993 with a record of 4-1-0 after losing to Michel Galarneau.

Retirement and coming out
In 1993, Leduc spoke about being a gay athlete in CBC Radio's documentary "The Last Closet", which aired on the weekly sports series The Inside Track; as he was not yet ready to officially come out, the interview was aired anonymously and recorded through a voice filter. Another Canadian athlete who would also subsequently come out as gay, Mark Tewksbury, also granted an anonymous interview to the same program. In 1994, Leduc officially came out as gay in the TV documentary For the Love of the Game, one of the few boxers ever to do so. He also later volunteered as a speaker and mentor for various LGBT youth groups.

He attended Toronto’s Pride Parade in 1999 as grand marshal with Savoy Howe. Leduc worked for and volunteered with the Toronto People with AIDS Foundation, later becoming a set-builder and construction worker in the film industry.

Leduc died on July 22, 2009 in Toronto. He had collapsed in the sauna of St. Mark's Spa and doctors suggested that his death may have resulted from heat stroke. In 2019 playwright Raymond Helkio wrote "LEDUC: A Public Life of Solitude", a play documenting the life and death of Mark Leduc.

References

External links
 

1962 births
2009 deaths
Boxers at the 1992 Summer Olympics
Deaths from hyperthermia
Gay sportsmen
LGBT boxers
Canadian LGBT sportspeople
Olympic boxers of Canada
Olympic medalists in boxing
Olympic silver medalists for Canada
Boxers from Toronto
Canadian male boxers
Boxers at the 1991 Pan American Games
Pan American Games competitors for Canada
Medalists at the 1992 Summer Olympics
Light-welterweight boxers
20th-century Canadian LGBT people
Canadian gay men